Adlan Bisultanov (born 15 August 1989) is a Russian judoka.

He is the gold medallist of the 2017 Judo Grand Prix Antalya in the -100 kg category.

References

External links
 

1989 births
Living people
Russian male judoka
20th-century Russian people
21st-century Russian people